= Forstsee =

- Location within Austria
- Location: Carinthia, Austria
- Coordinates: 46°38′N 14°04′E
- Type: lake

Forstsee is a lake of Carinthia, Austria.
